Painted Desert is a 1938 Western film directed by David Howard and starring George O'Brien and Laraine Day (billed as "Laraine Johnson").  The picture is a remake of The Painted Desert, which stars William Boyd and features an early appearance by Clark Gable in a major supporting role. The movie was partially filmed on location in Red Rock Canyon, a popular filming location during the 1930s and 1940s, with a multitude of B-Westerns being filmed there.

Plot
Bob, a young rancher, buys a mine on his leased land to prevent the working of it. However, surveys show a valuable mineral deposit, so he and Carol, the granddaughter of the discoverer of the mine, who has been forced to sell it to a crook, start operations on it. Fawcett, the crook, schemes to get the mine back, but is outwitted at every turn and loses his life in the dynamiting which he inspired.

Cast
 George O'Brien - Bob McVey
 Laraine Day - Miss Carol Banning (billed as Laraine Johnson)
 Ray Whitley - Steve
 Stanley Fields - Bill
 Maude Allen - Yukon Kate
 Fred Kohler - Hugh Fawcett (billed as Fred Kohler Sr.)
 Lloyd Ingraham - Charles M. Banning
 Harry Cording - Henchman Burke
 Max Wagner - Henchman Kincaid
 Lee Shumway - Bart Currie
 William V. Mong - Banker Heist

References

External links
 
 
 
 

1938 films
American black-and-white films
RKO Pictures films
1938 Western (genre) films
American Western (genre) films
Films directed by David Howard
Films produced by Bert Gilroy
1930s English-language films
1930s American films